Metapneumovirus is a genus of viruses in the family Pneumoviridae.

The genus contains two species:
 Avian metapneumovirus (aMPV)
 Human metapneumovirus (hMPV)

References

Virus genera
Pneumoviridae